Ann Morgan Williams (May 18, 1935 – December 13, 1985) was an American television, soap opera and Broadway actress.

A native of Washington, D.C., Williams' notable soap roles included stints on The Doctors as the first Dr. Maggie Fielding Powers and on The Edge of Night as television station owner Margo Huntington Dorn.

Her most memorable role, however, for which she is best-remembered, was as the second Eunice Gardner Wyatt, on Search for Tomorrow (1966–1976).

Her last soap opera role was as alcoholic June Slater on Loving, a role that, for a short time, reunited Williams and her former Search for Tomorrow co-star, John Cunningham (he had played Janet Bergman's psychiatrist husband Wade Collins).

She appeared on the Broadway stage in The Milk Train Doesn't Stop Here Anymore (1963) by Tennessee Williams and the musical Applause (1970).

Ann Williams died from cancer in 1985 in Bedford, New York. She was 50 years old.

Family
Williams had four children with husband Robert Daniel Peter Welch, who died April 21, 1982: Amanda Gordon Welch, Elizabeth Morgan Welch, Daniel Merryman Welch and Diana Rebecca Welch.

Almost all of the Welch children were minors at the time Williams died. The four siblings wrote a book about their family life after their parents' untimely deaths, The Kids Are All Right: A Memoir (Harmony/Random House, 2009).

References

External links

 IMDb filmography
 Ann Williams at the University of Wisconsin's Actors Studio audio collection

1935 births
1985 deaths
Actresses from Washington, D.C.
American soap opera actresses
American stage actresses
Deaths from cancer in New York (state)
People from Bedford, New York
20th-century American actresses